KAGR may refer to:

 KAGR-LP, a low-power radio station (92.1 FM) licensed to serve Arapahoe, Nebraska, United States
 Avon Park Air Force Range (ICAO code KAGR)